Brebel is a former municipality in the district of Schleswig-Flensburg, in Schleswig-Holstein, Germany. Since March 2018, it is part of the municipality Süderbrarup. Brebel is diveded into for four parts: The village of Groß-Brebel and the hamlets of Klein-Brebel, Brebelholz and Loitstraße. 

Brebel was first mentioned in King Valdemar's land register in 1231 as Brethæbøl. In 1799, the village got a school. In the years 1908 to 1969 there was a dairy in Brebel. Brebel has developed from a farming village into an almost purely residential area.

References

Former municipalities in Schleswig-Holstein
Schleswig-Flensburg